Level is a Swedish brand of cigarettes, currently owned and manufactured by JTI Sweden, a subsidiary of Japan Tobacco.

History
Level was launched in 2001 as a budget brand cigarette. Level was the first low priced cigarette introduced in Sweden. At introduction, a pack of Level cost 26 Swedish Krona.

Level has attracted some attention because of its slender profit margins. Of the approximately 30 Swedish Krona that a pack cost in 2005, the merchant charged about $1.65, which is about €5.00 for a normal package.

In 2015, a pack of Level cigarettes cost 50 Swedish Krona for both normal king size cigarettes and 100s cigarettes.

Markets
Level is mainly sold in Sweden, but also was or still is sold in Norway, Denmark, Poland, Ukraine and Russia.

Products
 Level Full Flavour
 Level Full Flavour 100's
 Level Smooth Flavour
 Level Smooth Flavour 100's
 Level Smooth Menthol
 Level Smooth Menthol 100's
 Level Menthol On Demand Full Flavour

Below are all the current brands of Level cigarettes sold, with the levels of tar, nicotine and carbon monoxide included.

See also
 Cigarette
 Tobacco smoking

References

Japan Tobacco brands